The 2016 Chennaiyin FC season was the club's third season since its establishment in 2014 and their third season in the Indian Super League.

Background

Going into the 2015 ISL season, Chennaiyin retained their head coach, Marco Materazzi, as well as the core of their playing squad with players such as Jeje Lalpekhlua, Balwant Singh, Jayesh Rane, Bernard Mendy, and marquee Elano returning for a second season. They began their season on 3 October 2015, hosting their first match of the ISL season against defending champions Atlético de Kolkata. Despite goals from Lalpekhlua and Elano, Chennaiyin lost the match 3–2. Despite a slow start to the season, Chennaiyin soon entered the finals, finishing the season in third place.

In the semi-finals, Chennaiyin FC took on Atlético de Kolkata. In the first leg of the round, Chennaiyin came out as 3–0 winners after goals from Bruno Pelissari, Jeje Lalpekhlua, and Stiven Mendoza. Despite losing the second leg 2–1, Chennaiyin went through to the finals 4–2 on aggregate.

During the final, Chennaiyin took on Goa at the Fatorda Stadium. They took a 1–0 lead in the beginning of the second half from Bruno Pelissari before Goa came back to lead 2–1 going into stoppage time. However, an own goal from Goa goalkeeper, Laxmikant Kattimani, and a goal from Mendoza from a defensive mistake lead to Chennaiyin winning to Indian Super League.

Player movement

Squad

Technical staff

Transfers

In:

Out:

Indian Super League

Results summary

Matches

Squad statistics

Appearances and goals

|-
|}

Goal scorers

Disciplinary record

See also
 2016–17 in Indian football

References

Chennaiyin FC seasons
Chennaiyin